Valentina Calabrese (born 23 April 1990) is an Italian female rower, medal winner at senior level at the European Rowing Championships.

She is the daughter of the Italian Olympic medal, the Messinese Giovanni Calabrese who is also her coach and Paola Grizzetti 6th in rowing at Los Angeles 1984.

References

External links
 

1990 births
Living people
Italian female rowers
Sportspeople from Turin